Ooencyrtus kuvanae is a species of chalcid wasp. It was introduced to North America in 1908 to control Lymantria moths. In North America, it has become an active parasitoid of the invasive spotted lanternfly.

References

Encyrtidae
Insects described in 1910